Pat Buckley may refer to:

Patricia Buckley (1926–2007), Canadian socialite and wife of William F. Buckley, Jr.
Patricia Buckley Bozell (1927–2008), American writer and sister of William F. Buckley, Jr.
Patricia Buckley Ebrey (born 1949), American historian of Chinese culture and gender studies
Paddy Buckley (1925–2008), Scottish international footballer
Pat Buckley (footballer) (born 1946), Scottish footballer, son of the above
Pat Buckley (priest) (born 1952), excommunicated Irish Catholic priest
Patrick Buckley (politician) (1841–1896), Irish New Zealand soldier, lawyer, politician
Pat Buckley (Irish politician) (born 1969), Irish politician
Pat Buckley (bobsleigh), American bobsleigher
Pat Buckley (Aghabullogue hurler), Irish hurler
Pat Buckley (Cork hurler) (born 1965), Irish hurler

See also 
Patrick Buckley (disambiguation)